Pinon, Piñon, Piñón, or Pinyon may refer to:

 Pinyon pine (piñon pine), a group of several species of North American pine trees (genus	Pinus)
 the edible pine nuts of these trees
 Pinyon-juniper woodland
 the edible seeds of the South American evergreen Araucaria araucana
 Pastelón, a traditional Puerto Rican layered casserole

People 
 Dominique Pinon (born 1955), French actor
 Pinon (Edom), a minor Old Testament figure

Places 
 Pinon, Aisne, a commune of the Aisne department in France
 Piñon, Arizona, United States
 Piñon, New Mexico, United States
 Piñon Canyon Maneuver Site, a large military base in Colorado

See also 
 Pinyan